In mathematics, Grunsky's theorem, due to the German mathematician Helmut Grunsky, is a result in complex analysis concerning holomorphic univalent functions defined on the unit disk in the complex numbers. The theorem  states that a univalent function defined on the unit disc, fixing the point 0, maps every disk |z| < r onto a starlike domain for r ≤ tanh π/4. The largest r for which this is true is called the radius of starlikeness of the function.

Statement 
Let f be a univalent holomorphic function on the unit disc D such that f(0) = 0. Then for all r ≤ tanh π/4, the image of the disc |z| < r is starlike with respect to 0, i.e. it is invariant under multiplication by real numbers in (0,1).

An inequality of Grunsky
If f(z) is univalent on D with f(0) = 0, then

Taking the real and imaginary parts of the logarithm, this implies the two inequalities

and

For fixed z, both these equalities are attained by suitable Koebe functions

where |w| = 1.

Proof
 originally proved these inequalities based on extremal techniques of Ludwig Bieberbach. More elementary proofs were subsequently given based on Goluzin's inequalities, an equivalent form of Grunsky's inequalities (1939) for the Grunsky matrix.

For a univalent function g  in z > 1 with an expansion

Goluzin's inequalities state that

where the zi  are distinct points with |zi| > 1  and λi are arbitrary complex numbers.

Taking n = 2. with λ1 = – λ2 = λ, the inequality implies

If g is an odd function and  η =  – ζ, this yields

Finally if f is any normalized univalent function in D, the required inequality for f follows by taking

with

Proof of the theorem
Let f be a univalent function on D with f(0) = 0. By Nevanlinna's criterion,  f is starlike on |z| < r if and only if

for |z| < r. Equivalently

On the other hand by the inequality of Grunsky above,

Thus if

the inequality holds at z.  This condition is equivalent to

and hence f is starlike on any disk |z| < r with r ≤ tanh π/4.

References

 (in Russian)

 (in German)
 (in German)

Theorems in complex analysis